is a website that allows users to search across dictionaries, encyclopedias, and databases provided by publishers and others. It is operated by Voyage Marketing Co. When the service was first launched in 2009, the name "kotobank" was used, but now it is written in katakana.

History 
In June 2008, the Asahi Shimbun and EC Navi Inc. launched the "Minna no Chiezo" service, an online version of "Chiezo," a dictionary of modern terms that was once published. The service was rebuilt as a dictionary platform in which various companies could participate. The "kotobank" service was launched on April 23, 2009, under the management of the Asahi Shimbun and EC Navi Inc. At the time of its launch, it claimed to cover a total of 430,000 entries in 44 dictionaries and encyclopedias, the core of which were provided by Kodansha, Shogakukan, and Asahi Shimbun Publishing. In its early days, the site had strong ties with the Asahi Shimbun, with related news from the Asahi Shimbun's website, asahi.com, appearing on its pages.

The Asahi Shimbun and Genesix began distributing the "kotobank for iPhone" electronic dictionary platform application for the iPhone in March 2011. In October 2011, EC Navi, which had been operating the site, changed its name to Voyage Group Inc.

On October 1, 2019, following a corporate reorganization of Voyage Group Inc, Voyage Marketing Inc, a subsidiary of Carta Holdings, will operate the company. In April 2021, the Asahi Shimbun logo will disappear from the site and become the sole display of Voyage Marketing, and the registered trademark was also transferred from Asahi Shimbun to Voyage Marketing. At the same time, the link to Kotobank from the Asahi Shimbun homepage was also lost.

Reliability 
When the service was launched in 2009, the Asahi Shimbun and other operators pointed out the unreliability of information on the Internet and stated, "We aim to be the largest free glossary site in Japan with high reliability, quality and searchability of information. We will build a highly reliable website," said Hiromi Onishi, head of the Digital Media Division at Asahi Shimbun.

The National Diet Library's Collections and Bibliography Department states that items listed in the Kotobank may be used as a reference when establishing new ordinary subjects in the National Diet Library's Subject Headings List if they "exist in book form, such as the Encyclopedia MyPedia, or are successors to it," and "the explanations of words and phrases are general rather than intended for specific users.

See also 
 Weblio - Similar services that allow batch searching from many dictionaries

References

External links 
 
 収録辞書一覧

Trademarks
Internet properties established in 2009
Japanese websites
Shogakukan
Kodansha
Asahi Shimbun Company
Online dictionaries
Online encyclopedias